West Bloomfield School District is located in the township of West Bloomfield, Michigan. It was formed in 1949 and covers approximately sixteen square miles. It serves portions of West Bloomfield, all of Keego Harbor, about 99% of Orchard Lake Village and about 10% of Sylvan Lake.

History
Settled in the early days of the 19th century, the district was originally a farming community. Late in the 19th and early in the 20th century, it became a popular lake resort area, accessible from Detroit by interurban railway. In the natural course of suburbanization, it became a highly desirable suburban bedroom community and today is a well developed and maintained area of single family homes and some up-scale condominiums and apartments.

Board of Education
The board is responsible for carrying out mandatory laws as expressed in the Michigan Constitution and Michigan Statutes, Federal Laws and Regulations relating to schools and school districts.
The three main responsibilities of the board are:
 Hiring the superintendent
 Adopting policies
 Adopting the budget

West Bloomfield School District Superintendents

Warren W. Abbott (1949-1952)
Dr. Leif A. Hougen (1952-1968)
Dr. Anthony Witham (1968-1973)
Dr. Jerry J. Herman (1973-1982)
Dr. Seymour Gretchko (1982-2002)
Dr. Gary Faber (2002-2008)
Dr. JoAnne Andrees (2008-2012)
Dr. Gerald D. Hill (2012–2022)
Dr. Dania Bazzi (2022 - Present)

Demographics
As of 2013 the district has 6,633 students, with 5,703 living within the district and 1,326 from outside the district as part of its "Schools of Choice" program. A 2008 survey indicated that major non-English languages spoken in families of students included Albanian, Arabic, Aramaic, Chinese, German, Hebrew, Hindi, Japanese, Korean, Romanian, Russian, Spanish and Urdu.

Preschool Academy

 West Bloomfield Preschool Academy

Elementary schools

 Doherty Elementary
 Gretchko Elementary
 Roosevelt Elementary
 Scotch Elementary
 Sheiko Elementary (Formerly Green Elementary)

Former Elementary Schools
 Gertrude V. Ealy Elementary

Middle schools
West Bloomfield Middle
Former Middle Schools
Abbott Middle
 Orchard Lake Middle

High schools

 West Bloomfield High
 Oakland Early College

Athletics
West Bloomfield Schools are a voluntary member of the Michigan High School Athletic Association (MHSAA). West Bloomfield High School is a member of the Oakland Activities Association which comprises 24 Oakland County Schools. It is divided into three or four divisions in order to develop equitable competition. Realignment takes place annually to ensure that the goals and criteria are met.

References

External links

 West Bloomfield School District

School districts established in 1949
School districts in Michigan
Education in Oakland County, Michigan
1949 establishments in Michigan